NOT TRUE @!{Infobox musical artist
| name             = La Sonora Dinamita
| image_size       = 
| landscape        = 
| alt              = 
| background       = group_or_band
| alias            = La Sonora Dinamita 
| origin           = Cartagena, Colombia 
| genre            = 
| years_active     = 
| label            = 
| associated_acts  = 
| website          = 
| current_members  = Charlie AlvarezTony PeregrinoOsman OcoroJohanna BetancourtCitlalli Moctezuma
| past_members     = Lucho ArgaínVilma DiazÁlvaro PavaIndia MeliyaraRodolfo AicardiMargarita VargasMacondoSalvadorean Susana VelásquezAdrianaLucy PeñalozaÁlvaro PizarroArmando HernándezLouis TowersCarlos PiñaZoila NietoLuz StellaWillie CalderónZayda SalademLeydi BallesterosGlenis RamírezRubianaPilar SolanoOrlando QuesadaMónica GuzmánMike AlvearMacondoLuz Esthela MontoyaGaby SánchezErnesto ElizondoCarmen GonzálezBibiana RamirezAmina Osorio
| module           = 
| module2          = 
| module3          = 
}}

La Sonora Dinamita is a Mexican-Colombian musical group that plays cumbia, a Tropical music genre from Colombia but popular throughout Latin America. As one of the first Cumbia groups to reach international success, it is credited with helping to popularize the genre throughout Latin America and the world.

The original orchestra was formed in 1960 in Cartagena de Indias under the direction of bandleader Lucho Argaín. It disbanded in 1963, but was re-formed in 1975 under the direction of Julio Ernesto Estrada "Fruko" Rincón, the artistic director of the Discos Fuentes record label. In 1981, the group released its first successful recordings, such as the classic "Mi Cucu." While the group's lineup has changed, it has always featured a strong female vocalist to accompany its ten-piece brass instrumentation, including Margarita Vargas (la Diosa de La Cumbia), Mélida Yará (La India Meliyará), Vilma Díaz (La Diva de La Cumbia), Susana Velasquez and other female vocalists and also several male vocalists.

Discography
 La Copa De La Vida 2019
 Juntos Por La Sonora 2016
 Los Mechones 2015
 Exitos Tropicosos 2015
 La Vibrante Sonora Dinamita 2015
 Que Nadie Sepa Mi Sufrir - Amor de Mis Amores 2014
 A Mover el Cucu 2014
 Cumbia Caliente con La Sonora Dinamita 2014
 La Gran Sonora Dinamita y sus Estrella 2014
 Esto si es Dinamita 2014
 Grandes Hits La Sonora Dinamita 2014
 Una Leyenda - La Sonora Dinamita 2014
 Historia Musical de La Sonora Dinamita 2014
 La Suprema Sonora Dinamita 2014
 La Tropicalisima Sonora Dinamita 2014
 20 Grandes Exitos 2011
 Dinamitazos de Oro decada de los 80 Vol.2 2005
 Dinamitazos de Oro decada de los 80 Vol.1 2005
 Canta como - Sing Along: La Sonora Dinamita 2002
 30 Pegaditas de Oro 1999
 A Mover la Colita 1999
 La Mera Mera 1999
 La Reina de La Cumbia 1997
 Super Exitos Vol.2 1996
 Super Exitos Vol 1 1994
 Chispeante 1993
 La Sonora Dinamita Gold 1991
 16 Supercumbias 1990
 30 Pegaditas de Oro Vol.1 1988
 16 Grandes Exitos 1987
 La Cumbia Nació en Barú 1982
 Dinamita 1963
 Ritmo 1960
 Fiesta en el Caribe 1958

Former Vocalists and their recordings (hits)

References

Colombian cumbia musical groups
Musical groups established in 1960
1960 establishments in Colombia
Universal Music Latin Entertainment artists